The flag of the Western European Union (WEU) was dark blue with a semicircle of ten yellow five pointed stars, broken at the top, with the organisation's initials in the centre. Although it is the flag of a military organisation, it has rarely been flown in military situations.

Design

The flag is dark blue with a semicircle of ten yellow five pointed stars, broken at the top, with the white letters WEU horizontally across the centre and UEO vertically across the centre sharing the letter E with the former set of initials. UEO is the French abbreviation for Western European Union (. The flag's blue colour with yellow stars is taken from the flag of the Council of Europe and European Union, however the number of stars is ten due to the WEU membership being of that number.

Use
The flag was rarely used, with the WEU being largely dormant before it was succeeded by the European Union's (EU) military activities. It was once flown on board an operational United States Navy warship, when it was used as the flagship of an Italian general (with a WEU crew) commanding WEU relief operations in Bosnia and Herzegovina. There are variants for its bodies, such as its assembly, used on formal occasions. The WEU treaty is now terminated, with WEU activities wound up by June 2011, so no further use of the flag is foreseeable.

Previous design

The current flag was in use only since 1993. Prior to that there was a similar design but with only nine stars (before Greece became a member) and the stars towards the base of the flag were progressively larger than those at the fringe. This design replaced the flag of the Western Union, the organisation that was transformed into the WEU upon the entry into force of the Modified Brussels Treaty.

See also
 Flag of the Western Union
 Flag of Europe
 Flag of NATO
 Flag of the European Coal and Steel Community
 Federalist flag

References

External links
 Flag of the Western European Union, Flags of the World.
 Discussion

Western European Union
Western European Union
Western European Union